Leptospermum continentale, commonly known as prickly tea-tree, is a species of slender, straggling shrub that is endemic to south-eastern Australia. It has sharp-pointed, narrowly egg-shaped leaves, white flowers arranged singly in leaf axils and woody fruit that remains on the plant when mature.

Description
It has smooth bark that is shed in stringy strips.

Taxonomy and naming
Leptospermum continentale was first formally described in 1989 by Joy Thompson in Telopea from specimens she collected in Kanangra-Boyd National Park in 1982. The specific epithet (continentale) refers to the distribution of the species on the Australian mainland, in contrast to its close relative Leptospermum scoparium that occurs in Tasmania, some Bass Strait Islands and New Zealand.

Distribution and habitat
Prickly tea-tree occurs from Mudgee in central eastern New South Wales and the Australian Capital Territory to the southern half of Victoria and south-eastern South Australia. It is widespread in heath and woodland in well-drained sandy soil but also in swampy places.

Use in horticulture
This tea-tree can be propagated from cuttings or from seed and is a hardy shrub that tolerates most soils and aspects, including poorly-drained sites.

References

continentale
Myrtales of Australia
Flora of the Australian Capital Territory
Flora of South Australia
Flora of New South Wales
Flora of Victoria (Australia)
Plants described in 1989
Taxa named by Joy Thompson